July 28 - Eastern Orthodox Church calendar - July 30

All fixed commemorations below are celebrated on August 11 by Old Calendar.

For July 29th, Orthodox Churches on the Old Calendar commemorate the Saints listed on July 16.

Saints
 Virgin-martyr Seraphima (Serapia) of Antioch (c. 117-138)
 Martyr Kallinikos of Cilicia in Asia Minor (c. 250)
 Martyr Theodota and her three sons in Bithynia (c. 304)
 Martyrs Benjamin and Berius, by the Palace of the Hebdomon.
 Martyr Mamas, by drowning.
 Martyr Basiliscus the Elder, by the sword.
 Martyr Ioannis.
 The holy Martyrs, a father and mother, with their two children, by fire.
 Blessed John the Soldier (c. 361)  (see also: July 30)
 Saint Theodosius the Younger, the pious emperor (450)
 Martyr Eustathius the Cobbler of Mtskheta, Georgia (589)
 Saint Constantine I, Patriarch of Constantinople (677)

Pre-Schism Western saints
 Saints Simplicius, Faustinus and Beatrix, two brothers and their sister martyred in Rome under Diocletian (c. 303)
 Saint Faustinus (4th century)
 Saint Prosper of Orleans, Bishop of Orleans in France (c.453)
 Saint Lupus the Confessor, Bishop of Troyes, Gaul (479)
 Saint Sulien (Sulian, Silin), born in Brittany, he founded a small monastery in Luxulyan in Cornwall (6th century)
 Saint Kilian, an abbot of a monastery on the island of Inis Cealtra in Ireland, and author of a Life of St Brigid (7th century)
 Saint Olaf II of Norway (Olav, Tola), King of Norway (1030)

Post-Schism Orthodox saints
 Saint Constantine III Leichoudes, Patriarch of Constantinople (1063)
 Saints Constantine and Cosmas of Kosinsk, in Pskov, Abbots (13th century)
 Saint Romanus of Kirzach, founder of Kirzhach Monastery, disciple of St. Sergius of Radonezh (1392)
 Saint Bogolep, Child Schemamonk of Black Ravine, near Astrakhan (1667)
 Hieromartyr Bessarion of Smolyan, Bulgaria (1670)
 Martyr Daniel Kushnir of Mlievich (Daniel of Cherkassk), Ukraine (1766)

New martyrs and confessors
 New Hieromartyrs Seraphim (Bogoslovsky) and Theognostus (Pivovarov), Hieromonks of a skete at Kyzyl-Zharskoe, Kazakhstan (1921)
 New Hieromartyr Anatole (Smirnov), Hieromonk and hermit of the Caucasus Mountains, Abkhazia (1930-1935)
 New Hieromartyr Pachomius (Rusin), Hieromonk, of Alma Ata, Kazakhstan (1938)
 New Hieromartyr Alexis Krasnovsky, Priest (1938)

Other commemorations
 Nativity of St. Nicholas the Wonderworker, Archbishop of Myra in Lycia (3rd century)
 Icon of the Most Holy Theotokos of Rudoe Selo (19th century)
 Repose of Archpriest Georges Florovsky (1979)

Icon gallery

Notes

References

Sources
 July 29/August 11. Orthodox Calendar (PRAVOSLAVIE.RU).
 August 11 / July 29. HOLY TRINITY RUSSIAN ORTHODOX CHURCH (A parish of the Patriarchate of Moscow).
 July 29. OCA - The Lives of the Saints.
 July 29. The Year of Our Salvation - Holy Transfiguration Monastery, Brookline, Massachusetts. 
 The Autonomous Orthodox Metropolia of Western Europe and the Americas (ROCOR). St. Hilarion Calendar of Saints for the year of our Lord 2004. St. Hilarion Press (Austin, TX). p. 56.
 The Twenty-Ninth Day of the Month of July. Orthodoxy in China.
 July 29. Latin Saints of the Orthodox Patriarchate of Rome.
 The Roman Martyrology. Transl. by the Archbishop of Baltimore. Last Edition, According to the Copy Printed at Rome in 1914. Revised Edition, with the Imprimatur of His Eminence Cardinal Gibbons. Baltimore: John Murphy Company, 1916. pp. 224–225.
 Rev. Richard Stanton. A Menology of England and Wales, or, Brief Memorials of the Ancient British and English Saints Arranged According to the Calendar, Together with the Martyrs of the 16th and 17th Centuries. London: Burns & Oates, 1892. pp. 367–368.

 Greek Sources
 Great Synaxaristes:  29 ΙΟΥΛΙΟΥ. ΜΕΓΑΣ ΣΥΝΑΞΑΡΙΣΤΗΣ.
  Συναξαριστής. 29 Ιουλίου. ECCLESIA.GR. (H ΕΚΚΛΗΣΙΑ ΤΗΣ ΕΛΛΑΔΟΣ). 
  29/07/. Ορθόδοξος Συναξαριστής.

 Russian Sources
  11 августа (29 июля). Православная Энциклопедия под редакцией Патриарха Московского и всея Руси Кирилла (электронная версия). (Orthodox Encyclopedia - Pravenc.ru).
  29 июля по старому стилю / 11 августа по новому стилю. СПЖ "Союз православных журналистов". .

July in the Eastern Orthodox calendar